Larisa Antonia Lillian Lee is an Australian politician. She was elected to the Northern Territory Legislative Assembly as the Country Liberal member for Arnhem at the 2012 territory election. She left the CLP on 4 April 2014, sat as independent until 27 April, when she joined the Palmer United Party, resigned from that party on 29 November, and sat as an independent until her defeat at the 2016 election.

Early life
She is the daughter of Jawoyn leader (Bangardi) Robert Lee.

Parliament

|}
Several months after her election, Lee was accused by staff members of the Jawoyn Association Aboriginal Corporation (JAAC) of misusing the corporation's emergency fund—put aside to assist Aboriginal people living in poverty—to pay for her election campaign expenses. On 4 February 2013, Lee submitted an amended Candidate Election Return to the Northern Territory Electoral Commission, declaring an additional $23,000 in donations, including $16,000 from the JAAC, in addition to the single $500 donation on her original declaration. She denied the staff members' accusations, saying that the corporation had donated money to her campaign with the full support of the board.

As of July 2013, Lee was under investigation for alleged misuse of her Government provided Fuel Card. On 14 October 2013, the ABC TV program Four Corners broadcast an investigative story concerning the alleged use of money from the Jawoyn Association, including Lee's use for her election campaign. On 25 April 2014, Lee was charged with aggravated assault and "disorderly behaviour in a public place" following an altercation with an 18-year-old woman outside a Centrelink in Katherine. The maximum sentence for the former charge is five years; she would have automatically lost her seat had she been sentenced to any term longer than one year. On 24 June, Lee pleaded guilty to the charge of common assault on the woman—her niece—for having an affair with her husband.

On 5 April 2014, Lee and two other indigenous MPs, Alison Anderson and Francis Xavier Kurrupuwu, resigned from the CLP, slipping their resignation letters under the door of the CLP office in Darwin. According to The Australian, they were laying the groundwork for a new party to speak for regional interests, but later that month, on 27 April 2014, the three MPs joined Palmer United, with Anderson becoming parliamentary leader.

However, that did not last and, later in 2014, Lee and Anderson became independents once again. Lee was defeated by Labor's Selena Uibo in Arnhem at the 2016 election. She received only 117 votes, or 4.0 percent, finishing in fifth and last place.

References

Year of birth missing (living people)
Living people
Members of the Northern Territory Legislative Assembly
Country Liberal Party members of the Northern Territory Legislative Assembly
Independent members of the Northern Territory Legislative Assembly
Indigenous Australian politicians
United Australia Party (2013) members of the Northern Territory Legislative Assembly
21st-century Australian politicians
21st-century Australian women politicians
Women members of the Northern Territory Legislative Assembly